Borghetto d'Arroscia (locally ) is a comune (municipality) in the Province of Imperia in the Italian region Liguria, located about  southwest of Genoa and about  north of Imperia.

Borghetto d'Arroscia borders the following municipalities: Aquila di Arroscia, Caprauna, Casanova Lerrone, Pieve di Teco, Ranzo, and Vessalico. It gets its name from the Arroscia, a large creek flowing down from Ligurian Alps.

References

Cities and towns in Liguria